The following article presents a summary of the 1910 football (soccer) season in Brazil, which was the 9th season of competitive football in the country.

Campeonato Paulista

Final Standings

sc corinthians p declared as the Campeonato Paulista champions.

State championship champions

References

 Brazilian competitions at RSSSF

 
Seasons in Brazilian football
Brazil